Naganishia vishniacii is an extremophile fungus originally isolated as a yeast from soil samples in the dry valleys of Antarctica. The species grows at 4 degrees Celsius and below but not at 26 degrees Celsius and above. Visually it is characterized as a cream mass in culture. It is nonfermentative and assimilates glucose, maltose, melezitose, trehalose, and xylose. Molecular research, based on cladistic analysis of DNA sequences, shows that the species does not belong in the Cryptococcaceae.

References

External links 

Tremellomycetes
Fungi of Antarctica